So Much Guitar! (stylized on the original album cover as SO Much Guitar!) is an album by American jazz guitarist Wes Montgomery, released by Riverside Records in 1961. It was reissued by Fantasy Records as a part of the Original Jazz Classics series.

All the tracks are available on the Wes Montgomery compilation CD The Complete Riverside Recordings.

Reception 

AllMusic critic Scott Yanow called the album "one of Wes Montgomery's finest recordings... All eight performances are memorable in their own way." PopMatters journalist Neil Kelly wrote: "So Much Guitar! is Montgomery at his most comfortably virile ... one of the finest recordings you’ll ever put in your player."

Track listing
"Twisted Blues" (Wes Montgomery) – 5:31
"Cotton Tail" (Duke Ellington) – 3:38
"I Wish I Knew" (Mack Gordon, Harry Warren) – 5:26
"I'm Just a Lucky So-and-So" (Ellington, Mack David) – 5:57
"Repetition" (Neal Hefti) – 3:48
"Somethin' Like Bags" (Montgomery) – 4:44
"While We're Young" (Morty Palitz, Alec Wilder) – 2:12
"One for My Baby (and One More for the Road)" (Harold Arlen, Johnny Mercer) – 7:38

Personnel
 Wes Montgomery – guitar
 Hank Jones – piano
 Ron Carter – bass
 Ray Barretto – conga
 Lex Humphries – drums

Production
 Orrin Keepnews – producer
 Ray Fowler – engineer

References

External links
Jazz Discography

1961 albums
Wes Montgomery albums
Albums produced by Orrin Keepnews
Riverside Records albums